Mammadbeyov (Russified: Mamedbekov) is a masculine surname, of Azerbaijani origin. The feminine counterpart name is Mammadbeyova. The name consists of three elements: Mammad, a reduced form of the male name Mahammad; bey, a title of a chief or a landowner; and the Russian ending -ov. It is the name of a noble family of Azerbaijan.

People with the surname Mammadbeyov 
Heybatgulu Mammadbeyov, Azerbaijan's tax minister in 1919–1920
Kamal Mammadbeyov (1924–97), architect and researcher (PhD in theory and history of architecture and restoration of architectural monuments). One of the first honored architects of Azerbaijan
Karim Mammadbeyov, Dagestani statesman of the 1920s and 1930s
Rashid Mammadbeyov, first Olympic medal winner from Azerbaijan

People with the surname Mammadbeyova 

 Gulnara Mehmandarova (born 1959) name at birth was Gulnara Mammadbeyova, architect and researcher (PhD in theory and history of architecture and restoration of architectural monuments). First President of ICOMOS Azerbaijan
 Leyla Mammadbeyova (1922–2006), physician and researcher. First female professor in Azerbaijan in the field of pathology, the first female forensic medical expert, and the first female chief pathologist of Azerbaijan
Leyla Mammadbeyova, first female pilot of Southern Europe and the Middle East

See also 
Mammad, name list 

Azerbaijani noble families
Azerbaijani-language surnames